Elizabeth Dickson (died 2022) was a Scottish international lawn bowler.

Dickson represented Scotland for 25 years at BIWBC Senior International level from 1998 to 2012. Dickson was a member of the Eyemouth BC. In 1994, she was selected by Scotland for the fours event at the 1994 Commonwealth Games in Victoria, British Columbia, Canada and won a bronze medal with Betty Forsyth, Janice Maxwell and Dorothy Barr.

In 1995 she won the fours gold medal at the Atlantic Bowls Championships.

Dickson died in 2022.

References

20th-century births
2022 deaths
Scottish female bowls players
Commonwealth Games bronze medallists for Scotland
Bowls players at the 1994 Commonwealth Games
Bowls players at the 1998 Commonwealth Games
Commonwealth Games medallists in lawn bowls
Year of birth missing
Medallists at the 1994 Commonwealth Games